Ibrahim Lalle Shuabu (born 19 December 1996) is a Nigerian professional footballer who plays as a striker for Iraqi club Erbil.

Career

Club
After playing for Giwa FC on loan for the 2015 season, Ibrahim went on trial with Norwegian side FK Haugesund in early 2016. Following a successful trial period, Ibrahim signed a three-year contract with Haugesund on 30 January 2016.

On 13 February 2022, Armenian Premier League club Noravank announced the singing of Ibrahim.

On 5 August 2022, Shuaibu Ibrahim joined Iraqi club Erbil.

Career statistics

Club

References

External links
Haugesund Profile

1996 births
Living people
Nigerian footballers
Association football forwards
Giwa F.C. players
FK Haugesund players
Kongsvinger IL Toppfotball players
Bnei Sakhnin F.C. players
Mjøndalen IF players
FK Jerv players
Erbil SC players
Eliteserien players
Norwegian First Division players
Israeli Premier League players
Iraqi Premier League players
Nigerian expatriate footballers
Expatriate footballers in Norway
Expatriate footballers in Israel
Expatriate footballers in Iraq
Nigerian expatriate sportspeople in Norway
Nigerian expatriate sportspeople in Israel
Nigerian expatriate sportspeople in Iraq